2014 in Ghana details events of note that has been predicted to happen in the Ghana in the year 2014.

Incumbents
 President: John Dramani Mahama
 Vice President: Kwesi Amissah-Arthur
 Chief Justice: Georgina Wood
 Speaker of Parliament: Edward Adjaho

Events

January

February
February 1, National Petroleum Authority increase fuel prices. Petrol is increased by 3 percent, kerosene is increased by 1.24and diesel by 3.31 percent.
February 4, First Capital Plus Bank is named headline sponsor of the Ghana Premier League.

March
March 6, Independence Day.

April

May

June

July
Castro (Ghanaian Musician) dies 6 July 2014

August

September

October

November

December

Concerts

Television

National holidays
Holidays in italics are "special days", while those in regular type are "regular holidays".
 January 1: New Year's Day
 March 6: Independence Day
 April 22 Good Friday
 May 1: Labor Day
 May 25: Africa Day
 July 1: Republic Day
 September 22: Founder's Day (Ghana)
 December 5: Farmers Day
 December 25: Christmas
 December 26: Boxing day

In addition, several other places observe local holidays, such as the foundation of their town. These are also "special days."

References

 
Years of the 21st century in Ghana
Ghana
2010s in Ghana
Ghana